Blac or BLAC may refer to:

Blaç, a village in Kosovo
Suzzan Blac, English artist
Beijing Light Automobile Company
Kimora Blac, American drag queen

See also